The Roach Guards were an Irish criminal gang in Five Points neighborhood of New York City  the early 19th century. The gang was originally formed to protect New York liquor merchants in Five Points and soon began committing robbery and murder. The Roach Guards took their name from their founder and leader Ted Roach.

The Roach Guards began fighting with rivals the Bowery Boys.  Some former Roach Guard members were called the Dead Rabbits by the media. The internal feud was especially violent as they fought over the Five Points area.  Despite constant fighting, they managed to hold their own in the "slugger battles" against the more organized and disciplined "Bowery Boys". The Roach Guards, however, began to decline during the 1850s, disappearing entirely by the end of the American Civil War in 1865.

References

References
Asbury, Herbert. The Gangs of New York. New York: Alfred A. Knopf, 1928. 
Sifakis, Carl. The Encyclopedia of American Crime. New York: Facts on File Inc., 2001. 

Former gangs in New York City
Irish-American gangs
Irish-American culture in New York City
Five Points, Manhattan